The National Service of Remembrance is held every year on Remembrance Sunday at the Cenotaph on Whitehall, London. It commemorates "the contribution of British and Commonwealth military and civilian servicemen and women in the two World Wars and later conflicts". The service has its origins in the 1920s and has changed little in format since.

To open the ceremony, a selection of national airs and solemn music representing each of the nations of the United Kingdom are played by massed bands and pipes. A short religious service is held with a two-minute silence commencing when Big Ben chimes at 11 am. Following this, wreaths are laid by the King and members of the royal family, senior politicians representing their respective political parties and High commissioners from the Commonwealth of Nations. After a short religious service, a march-past of hundreds of veterans processes past the Cenotaph.

It is held on the second Sunday in November, the Sunday nearest to 11 November, Armistice Day, the anniversary of the end of hostilities in the First World War at 11 a.m. in 1918. The ceremony has been broadcast nationally by the BBC on radio since 1928 and was first broadcast by the BBC Television Service in 1937.

Origins

The Cenotaph has its origin in a temporary wood and plaster structure designed by Edwin Lutyens for a peace parade following the end of the First World War. Lutyens was inspired by the Greek idea of a cenotaph  kenotaphion (κενός kenos, meaning "empty", and τάφος taphos, "tomb"), as representative for a tomb elsewhere or in a place unknown. For some time after the parade, the base of the memorial was covered with flowers and wreaths by members of the public. Pressure mounted to retain it, and the British War Cabinet decided on 30 July 1919 that a permanent memorial should replace the wooden version and be designated Britain's official national war memorial.

Lutyens's permanent structure was built from Portland stone between 1919 and 1920 by Holland, Hannen & Cubitts as a "replica exact in every detail in permanent material of present temporary structure".

The memorial was unveiled by King George V on 11 November 1920, the second anniversary of the Armistice with Germany which ended the First World War. The unveiling ceremony was part of a larger procession bringing the Unknown Warrior to be laid to rest in his tomb nearby in Westminster Abbey. The funeral procession route passed the Cenotaph, where the waiting King laid a wreath on the Unknown Warrior's gun-carriage before proceeding to unveil the memorial which was draped in large Union Flags.

During the Second World War, the National Service and other commemorations were moved from Armistice Day itself to the preceding Sunday as an emergency measure, to minimise any loss of wartime production. In 1945, 11 November fell on a Sunday but in 1946, following a national debate, the government announced that the Cenotaph ceremony would henceforward on take place on Remembrance Sunday.

Order of service 

The ceremony begins at precisely 10:36 a.m. with a programme of music known as "the Traditional Music", a sequence beginning with "Rule Britannia!" which has remained largely unchanged since 1930. This comprises a selection of National Airs and solemn music representing the four nations of the United Kingdom performed by the massed bands of the Household Division interposed Pipes and Drums from the Highlanders 4th Battalion The Royal Regiment of Scotland. The massed band represents the four nations; the Band of the Grenadier Guards, Band of the Coldstream Guards, Band of the Scots Guards and the Band of the Irish Guards.
As the band plays "Dido's Lament" by Henry Purcell, the clergy led by a cross-bearer and the choir of the Chapel Royal process. The service is led by the Dean of the Chapels Royal, usually the Bishop of London. During Solemn Melody by Henry Walford Davies, politicians, high commissioners and religious leaders from many faiths assemble, joined by humanists representing the non-religious. The parade stands to attention in silence as the Royal Family emerge.

As Big Ben strikes 11 a.m., the King's Troop Royal Horse Artillery fire a single shot salute from First World War-era guns on Horse Guards Parade. Two minutes' silence is then observed. The silence represents the eleventh hour of the eleventh day of the eleventh month in 1918, when the guns of Europe fell silent. This silence is ended by Gunners of the Royal Horse Artillery firing a gun salute, then Royal Marines buglers sound The Last Post.

The first wreath is traditionally laid on behalf of the nation by His Majesty The King, followed by other members of the Royal Family.

On two occasions foreign heads of state have laid wreaths on behalf of their people. In 2015, Willem-Alexander, King of the Netherlands, placed a wreath in commemoration of the 70th anniversary of the British liberation of the Netherlands in World War II. At the 2018 service, Frank-Walter Steinmeier, President of Germany, at the invitation of Queen Elizabeth II on the advice of her government, next laid a wreath on behalf of the German people, marking the first time a representative of that country has done so.

Wreaths are then laid by senior members of the royal family. After The King, The Queen Consort's wreath is laid on her behalf; followed by the Prince of Wales, the Duke of Sussex, the Duke of York and the Earl of Wessex; then by the Princess Royal, the Duke of Kent and (in 2018) Prince Michael of Kent. The Queen Consort and other members of the Royal Family watch the ceremony from the Foreign Office balcony.

The Massed Band plays "Beethoven Funeral March No.1" by Johann Heinrich Walch as wreaths laid by the Prime Minister on behalf of His Majesty's Government (and other Commonwealth leaders if they are present), the Leader of the Opposition, then leaders of major political parties; the Speaker of the House of Commons and the Lord Speaker; the Foreign Secretary; the Home Secretary (in 2019); Commonwealth High Commissioners, plus the former living UK prime ministers (John Major, Tony Blair, Gordon Brown, David Cameron, Theresa May,  Boris Johnson and Liz Truss) and the ambassadors of Ireland (since 2014) and Nepal (since 2019); representatives from the Royal Navy, Army and Royal Air Force; the Merchant Navy and fishing fleets; and finally, the civilian emergency services.

A short religious service of remembrance is then conducted by the Bishop of London in their capacity as Dean of the Chapel Royal. The hymn O God Our Help In Ages Past is sung, led by the massed bands and the Choir of the Chapel Royal. The whole assembly recites Lord's Prayer before the Bishop completes the service. The Rouse is then played by the buglers, followed by the national anthem being sung by all. The King and the other members of the Royal Family salute the Cenotaph and the royal party depart.

After the ceremony, as the bands play a selection of marches and arrangements of WW1 and WW2-era popular songs, a huge parade of veterans, organised by the Royal British Legion, marches past the Cenotaph, saluting as they pass. Members of the Reserve Forces and cadet organisations join in with the marching, alongside volunteers from St John Ambulance, paramedics from the London Ambulance Service, and conflict veterans from World War II, Korea, the Falklands, the Persian Gulf, Kosovo, Bosnia, Northern Ireland, Iraq, Afghanistan and other past conflicts. The last three then known British-resident veterans of World War I, Bill Stone, Henry Allingham and Harry Patch, attended the 2008 ceremony but all died in 2009. 

Each contingent salutes the Cenotaph as they pass and many wreaths are handed over to be laid at its base. They salute the Cenotaph (meaning "empty tomb" in Greek) as they are paying tribute to all those it represents, to all those who died and who lie buried elsewhere. As the veterans march back to Horse Guards Parade a member of the Royal Family takes their salute in front of the Guards Memorial.

Professor Jeffrey Richards notes that the format of the ceremony was "more or less finalized by 1921" although before the Second World War, the wreath-laying by the monarch and dignitaries took place before 11 am.

Traditional music
Each year, the programme of music at the National Ceremony remains the same, following a programme finalised in 1930, and is known as "the Traditional Music":

Other pieces of music are then played during the unofficial wreath laying and the march past of the veterans, starting with Trumpet Voluntary and followed by It's A Long Way To Tipperary, the marching song of the Connaught Rangers, a famous British Army Irish Regiment of long ago and by the Royal British Legion March, the official march of the official organiser of the ceremony, The Royal British Legion, which is a medley of marches of the First and Second World Wars.

Broadcasts

BBC Radio has broadcast the service on the BBC National Programme and its successors, the BBC Home Service and BBC Radio 4, every year since November 1928, except during World War II.

John Reith had wished to broadcast the service for many years, and upon the formation of the British Broadcasting Corporation in 1927 was involved with negotiations with the Home Office, but these broke down and it was only permitted the following year in 1928. Adrian Gregory notes that the paradox of broadcasting two minute's silence was not lost on the BBC's sound engineers, who had to ensure that there was enough ambient sound (the "strange hush") to capture the solemnity of the moment.

The ceremony was first broadcast by BBC Television in 1937 and again in 1938. Three EMI Super-Emitron cameras first used for the earliest outside broadcast of the Coronation Procession of King George VI in May 1937 were used, relayed via the BBC's Mobile Control Room scanner van, which two days earlier had also broadcast the Lord Mayor's Show for the first time.

The BBC Television Service was suspended at the outbreak of World War II and the broadcast resumed in November 1946 when George VI unveiled the addition of the dates of that conflict (1939—MCMXXXIX; and 1945—MCMXLV) to the Cenotaph. It has been televised every year since, making the broadcast one of the longest-running live broadcasts in the world.

In the post-war period, Wynford Vaughan-Thomas and latterly Richard Dimbleby were commentators. Tom Fleming commentated annually between 1966 and 1988, and again from 1994 to 1999. David Dimbleby, the eldest son of Richard Dimbleby, first provided the commentary on the event in 1989, and has done so every year since 2000; Eric Robson commentated in 1991 and 1993.

See also

Remembrance Sunday
Remembrance Day
Two-minute silence

Notes

References

External links
Royal British Legion National Service of Remembrance page
The Commonwealth War Graves Commission
The Department for Culture, Media and Sport – UK National Service of Remembrance

November observances
Observances honoring victims of war
Sunday observances
The Royal British Legion
Observances in the United Kingdom